Hadena pumila is a species of moth of the  family Noctuidae. It is found in Greece, Turkey, Transcaucasia, Israel, Lebanon, Jordan, Syria and Iran.

Adults are on wing from May to July in one generation in Israel.

Subspecies
Hadena pumila pumila
Hadena pumila phoenica

External links
 Hadeninae of Israel

Hadena
Moths of Europe
Moths of Asia
Moths described in 1879